Nury Vittachi (born 2 October 1958) is a journalist and author based in Hong Kong. He has written the novel series The Feng Shui Detective, as well as non-fiction works and novels for children.

Journalism career
Vittachi started his career working for the Morning Telegraph in Sheffield. 

He worked for the South China Morning Post as a humor columnist known as Lai See until 1997.

He has been previously described as an "outspoken critic of China". 

Vittachi has been part of the Hong Kong Young Writers’ awards for over a decade. The awards encourage and promote literature among kids, ages 6 to 18, from various backgrounds and learning styles, attracting thousands of entries from Hong Kong, Macau and China.

In 2020, Vittachi published a book alleging that the 2019–20 Hong Kong protests were partially funded supported by the Central Intelligence Agency through the Oslo Freedom Foundation, the Albert Einstein Institution, and the Centre for Applied Nonviolent Action and Strategies and "revolution consultants".

Personal life 
Vittachi was born in Sri Lanka to a Buddhist mother and Muslim father and currently resides in Hong Kong with his wife and children.

Bibliography

Non-fiction 
Reliable Sauce (1990)
Only in Hong Kong (1993)
Travellers' Tales (1994)
Goodbye Hong Kong, Hello Xianggang (1997)
The Ultimate Only in Hong Kong Collection (1998)
Guardians of the Treasure House (1998)
Riding the Millennial Storm (1998)
North Wind (1999)
City of Dreams (2006)
The Kama Sutra of Business (2007)
The Other Side of the Story: A Secret War in Hong Kong (2020)

Fiction 
The Hong Kong Joke Book (1995)
Asian Values (1996)
The Feng Shui Detective (2000)
The Feng Shui Detective Goes South (2002)
The Feng Shui Detective’s Casebook (2003)
The Shanghai Union of Industrial Mystics (2006)
Mr. Wong Goes West (2008)
The Curious Diary of Mr. Jam (2012)

Children’s books 
Ludwig and the Chewy Chunks Café (1994)
Robot Junior (1998)
The Amazing Life of Dead Eric (2001) 
Dead Eric Gets a Virus (2002)
The True History of Santa Claus (2004) 
The Day it Rained Letters (2005) 
The Paper Princess (2005) 
May Moon and the Secrets of the CPAs (2006) 
Mozzle and the Giant (2006) 
The Place You’re Meant to Be (2006) 
The World’s Funniest Book of Poems (2006) 
Twilight in the Land of Nowhen (2006)
Jeri Telstar, The Homework Hero (2008)
Jeri Telstar, And the Small Black Dog that Talked Like the President (2008)

References

External links 

 the writers' village, "an Asia-based community centre for authors" established by Vittachi
 Vittachi's blog
 A scholarly review of Vittachi's work by Dr Stuart Christie
 The Asia Literary Review
 The Hong Kong International Literary Festival

Living people
Hong Kong writers
1958 births
Hong Kong people of Sri Lankan descent